Robert Victor Alexander Stamp (born 1 August 1999) is a former English professional footballer who played as a forward.

Club career
Stamp made his senior debut for Kitchee on 20 December 2016, coming on as a substitute at the 54th minute in a 4–1 win over HKFC in the Hong Kong FA Cup.

After suffering from a serious injury, Stamp quitted professional football in 2018.

Personal life
Born in England, Stamp moved to Hong Kong before his first birthday. He was raised in Hong Kong and was educated at Island School.

References

External links

1999 births
Living people
Hong Kong Premier League players
Kitchee SC players
People educated at Island School
English footballers
English expatriate footballers
Association football forwards